CCTV drain cameras, also known as sewer cameras or pipe inspection cameras, are a line of waterproof, high definition cameras that have become a widely popular technology in the plumbing profession. These cameras are advanced diagnostic tools that allow plumbers to execute plumbing inspections with heightened accuracy.
 

These cameras can vary; the main difference being the size of the pipe the camera ca inspect. The total distance they can travel within the pipeline is also a common difference between models.

Purpose
CCTV drain cameras are used to uncover any damages or obstructions within the plumbing system.  They are the modern day technology that is used for surveying and assessing the working condition of water pipes and sewer lines. 

In the plumbing world, these cameras are commonly used to locate any debris buildups, collapsed pipe sections, root infestations, and pipe offsets. They allow the professional to form a highly accurate diagnosis.

How they are used
The camera, attached to a long chord, is fed through an access point on the property. It is then maneuvered through the pipes to the point of damage of obstruction. The captured footage is sent directly to a screen, giving the plumber a live view of the affected area. 

Commonly, drain cameras are used in tandem with high pressure water jetters.

References 

Plumbing
Piping